Sedum brevifolium is a slowly spreading succulent plant in the genus Sedum.

References

brevifolium